In enzymology, a L-xylulokinase is an enzyme that catalyzes the chemical reaction

ATP + L-xylulose  ADP + L-xylulose 5-phosphate

Thus, the two substrates of this enzyme are ATP and L-xylulose, whereas its two products are ADP and L-xylulose 5-phosphate.

This enzyme belongs to the family of transferases, specifically those transferring phosphorus-containing groups (phosphotransferases) with an alcohol group as acceptor.  The systematic name of this enzyme class is ATP:L-xylulose 5-phosphotransferase. This enzyme is also called L-xylulokinase (phosphorylating).  This enzyme participates in pentose and glucuronate interconversions and ascorbate and aldarate metabolism.

References

 

EC 2.7.1
Enzymes of unknown structure